Coward Hero is a 2019 Chinese comedy film directed by Shu Huan and Shao Dan and stars Yue Yunpeng and Tong Liya. The film premiered in China on August 2, 2019.

Cast
 Yue Yunpeng as Yan Dahai
 Tong Liya as Du Qing
 Yuan Hong as Xing Tiecheng
 Tian Yu as Zhao Hanqing
 Han Tongsheng as Zhou Jidao
 Liu Wei as Master Xuan
 Dong Chengpeng as the Gun god
 Lei Jiayin as the second chief of Qinglong Gang

Production
Shu Huan has said he had spent 5 years developing the film.

Release
The film premiered at Shanghai International Film Festival on June 16, 2019, and opened in China on August 2, 2019.

Reception
Douban, a major Chinese media rating site, gave the drama 5.6 out of 10.

References

External links
 
 
 

2019 films
2010s Mandarin-language films
Chinese comedy films
2019 comedy films